Synchlora is a genus of moths in the family Geometridae erected by Achille Guenée in 1857.

Species
The genus includes the following species:

 Synchlora aerata (Fabricius, 1798)
 Synchlora amplimaculata (Herbulot, 1991)
 Synchlora apicata (Warren, 1900)
 Synchlora astraeoides (Warren, 1901)
 Synchlora atrapes (Druce, 1892)
 Synchlora bidentifera (Warren, 1901)
 Synchlora bistriaria (Packard, 1876)
 Synchlora bistriata (Warren, 1897)
 Synchlora concinnaria (Schaus, 1912)
 Synchlora cupedinaria (Grote, 1880)
 Synchlora decorata (Warren, 1901)
 Synchlora delicatula (Dognin, 1909)
 Synchlora dependens (Warren, 1904)
 Synchlora despicata (Prout, 1932)
 Synchlora dilucida (Warren, 1900)
 Synchlora ephippiaria (Moschler, 1886)
 Synchlora expulsata (Walker, 1861)
 Synchlora faseolaria (Guenee, 1857)
 Synchlora fringillata (Schaus, 1897)
 Synchlora frondaria Guenee, 1858
 Synchlora gerularia (Hubner, 1823)
 Synchlora graefiaria (Hulst, 1886)
 Synchlora hebescens (Prout, 1933)
 Synchlora herbaria (Fabricius, 1794)
 Synchlora indecora (Prout, 1916)
 Synchlora irregularia (Barnes & McDunnough, 1918)
 Synchlora isolata (Warren, 1900)
 Synchlora leucoceraria (Snellen, 1874)
 Synchlora magnaria (Bastelberger, 1911)
 Synchlora merlinaria (Schaus, 1940)
 Synchlora naenia (Druce, 1892)
 Synchlora noel (Sperry, 1949)
 Synchlora orthogramma (Dyar, 1912)
 Synchlora pectinaria (Grossbeck, 1910)
 Synchlora pomposa (Dognin, 1898)
 Synchlora pulchrifimbria (Warren, 1907)
 Synchlora rufilineata (Warren, 1897)
 Synchlora superaddita (Prout, 1913)
 Synchlora suppomposa (Prout, 1916)
 Synchlora tenuimargo (Warren, 1905)
 Synchlora venustula (Dognin, 1910)
 Synchlora xysteraria (Hulst, 1886)

References

External links

Synchlorini